Mr. Boogedy is a 1986 family short film directed by Oz Scott and written by Michael Janover. It was developed as a television pilot and aired as an episode of The Disney Sunday Movie. A sequel named Bride of Boogedy aired in 1987.

The film tells the story of the Davis family as they move to the New England city of Lucifer Falls, which they soon find to be haunted by ghosts from the colonial period.

The film was made available to stream on Disney+.

Plot
Thrilled to finally move into a full-sized house in Lucifer Falls, New England, Carlton and Eloise Davis along with their children Jennifer, Corwin, and R.E. arrive at their new home on a dark, gloomy night. As they enter and search for a light switch, they are spooked by an old man named Neil Witherspoon who warns them about the house's tragic history telling them to beware of the Boogedy Man.

After Mr. Witherspoon leaves, the family checks out their new home. While Corwin and R.E. inspect the ground floor, Jennifer looks around upstairs. She hears someone sneezing and sees a blue light emanating from behind the door at the end of the hallway, but when she opens the door the room is empty. Meanwhile, the boys have made their way to the house's eerie basement, where R.E. finds a toy rocking chair that fits his teddy bear perfectly. Just when it seems that they might find something supernatural, Carlton flips on the lights, which show nothing but old furniture and other clutter. The boys grudgingly return upstairs, but on his way up, R.E. notices that his teddy bear has disappeared.

The next morning, the family gathers for a breakfast filled with gags: funny glasses and rubber eggs that squirt water. Jennifer complains about the strange sneezing, but Carlton reassures her that ghosts aren't real. That night, Jennifer walks down the hallway, drawn by the sneezing and the strange glow (now green) from the door at the end of the hallway. She opens the door, only to be blasted with bright lights and a strange wind. She faints as maniacal laughter is heard. Later that night, her family wakes her, and she informs them that she saw the Boogedy Man, describing him as having a yucky, grilled cheese sandwich like face. Opening the door, Carlton discovers green footprints running up the wall of the room. He peels a few off the wall, and is able to stick them to himself, prompting him to quip "Honey, look, the Boogedy Man walked all over me!" He assumes that it's all part of a gag set up by Mr. Witherspoon.

After Corwin and R.E. witness the kitchen cabinets and appliances move on their own, they go into town with Jennifer to look for answers. They find the Lucifer Falls Historical Society, which is run by Mr. Witherspoon. Amused by the children's curiosity, he produces an old pop-up book and tells them the tale of William Hanover, a grouchy old pilgrim man who fell in love with the lovely widow Marion 300 years ago. Marion did not reciprocate his feelings, so Hanover struck a deal with the Devil selling his soul for a magic cloak which granted him mystical powers. He kidnapped Marion's son Jonathan and, casting his first spell, accidentally destroyed his own house (located on the same spot as the Davises' current home), killing himself, Jonathan, and Marion. All three remained as ghosts; Boogedy (how William came to be known as) and Jonathan (who had a cold when he died) are trapped inside the house, and Marion is unable to enter and get her child back.

The children return home and tell their parents about the situation, but Carlton and Eloise are more interested in showing off their new gags, such as a lifesize mummy. As Carlton begins to assure the children that the house isn't haunted, paranormal activity peaks: the harpsichord plays on its own, the lights flicker, and the mummy appears to come to life, dancing wildly, prompting Eloise to exclaim "That's it! Time to call a realtor!" Eloise and the children are scared enough to leave, but Carlton convinces them to stay for the night, camped out together in the living room. Eloise wakes up for a midnight snack, and encounters the ghost of the Widow Marion, who relates her story from outside the back door.

Eloise wakes the rest of the family, and explains to them that Marion told her the only way to get rid of Boogedy is to take away his magic cloak. The Davises arm themselves with household items and head upstairs to search for Boogedy. R.E. hears a noise, and goes off on his own, towards the basement; Corwin notices his absence and follows. Carlton, Eloise, and Jennifer approach the door at the end of the hallway, but discover that the glowing green light is this time nothing more than a green light bulb—Boogedy tricked them. In the basement, Corwin finds R.E struggling to recover his teddy bear from the thief, who turns out to be young Jonathan's ghost, who still has a cold after all these years. He explains that he borrowed it only because he was lonely. Feeling sorry for him, R.E. lets him borrow the teddy bear, and Jonathan tells them stories about the previous families that Boogedy chased away. They're interrupted by heavy breathing; Mr. Boogedy is coming.

The boys run upstairs, reuniting with the rest of their family in the living room as Mr. Boogedy appears with a bright flash of green light. The Davises run for cover behind boxes of gag items, with Boogedy shocking anyone who nears him with bolts of electricity from his fingers. Corwin attempts to attack Boogedy, but he uses his magic to turn his assault against him. Boogedy likewise uses magic to disable Carlton, Jennifer, and Eloise.

R.E grabs the vacuum cleaner and sneaks behind Mr. Boogedy, shooting the plastic balls at him. Boogedy, not deterred, takes control of the vacuum, making it chase R.E. around the room. R.E. hides behind Boogedy, and the vacuum takes hold of Boogedy's cloak, sucking it right off of his back. Without his cloak, Mr. Boogedy seems powerless, and disappears. The cloak itself pops out of the vacuum cleaner, and Corwin tosses it into the air, saying "Boogedy boogedy boo!" makes it disappear in a flash of green light. Widow Marion and Jonathan appear, and the Davises look on as the ghosts embrace and then disappear in a dance of light. The house is supposedly no longer haunted, but the Davises hear Boogedy's voice grimly intoning "Wanna bet?", leaving open the possibility of his return.

Cast
 Richard Masur as Carlton Davis
 Mimi Kennedy as Eloise Davis
 Benjamin Gregory as Reginald Ernest "R.E." Davis 
David Faustino as Corwin Davis
Kristy Swanson as Jennifer Davis
 Howard Witt as William Hanover / Mr. Boogedy
 John Astin as Neil Witherspoon
 Katherine Kelly Lang as Widow Marion
 Jaimie McEnnan as Jonathan
 Kedric Wolfe as Satan

References

External links

1986 films
1986 television films
1986 short films
1980s ghost films
Disney television films
American haunted house films
Boogedy, Mister
The Devil in film
Films set in New England
Films scored by John Addison
Television pilots not picked up as a series
Television films as pilots
1980s American films